The Kaslo and Slocan Railway (K&S) is a historic railway that operated in the West Kootenay region of southeastern British Columbia. The K&S connected Kaslo and Sandon. Initially a narrow-gauge railway, the line was later rebuilt to standard gauge.

Narrow gauge

Proposal
The 1891 discovery of silver in the Slocan Range created a mining boom. A railway to transport ore was crucial for commercial mining. In 1892, the province issued the charter to promoter John Hendry for a standard gauge line, amended to  narrow gauge in 1894. Planned was a western terminal at Cody, with a spur to Sandon. The May 1893 stock market collapse and drop in the silver price depressed the economy, which delayed construction and prompted the narrow gauge decision. This choice halved construction costs. Steamboat connections on Kootenay Lake were southward from Kaslo to Five Mile Point (east of Nelson), which linked with the Nelson and Fort Sheppard Railway.

Construction
In 1893, the Great Northern Railway (GN) agreed to fund the project. Foley Bros & Guthrie were the principal contractors. Grading began in May 1895. Porter Bros. were the subcontractors for the trestles, the railway wharf at Kaslo, and most of the tracklaying. The westward rail head reached the revised terminal of Sandon that October.

Operation
In November 1895, the first ore was carried. The next month, disputes with the N&S, a Canadian Pacific Railway (CP) subsidiary, led to violent confrontations.  Initially offering lower rates than the N&S, the K&S carried over 80 per cent of Slocan ore, but the proximity of track to the mines determined the carrier in most instances. Agreeing to avoid rate wars, a tenuous truce existed.

In the absence of snow sheds, avalanches closed the line for days. The route incurred the highest expense per train mile in Canada. The K&S received a rotary snowplow in February 1897, and the Lucky Jim snowshed was erected in late 1899. However, slides comprising timber, mud, and rock, destroyed trestles and track throughout the life of the line. The Kaslo–Sandon–Cody passenger and freight service was daily, but Sandon–Cody reduced to twice weekly in November 1901.

By 1898, the K&S showed a healthy operating profit. Earnings per train mile ranked among the best in Canada, but costs were among the worst. Consolidating related enterprises, the Kootenay Railway and Navigation Co. (KR&N), a new venture and GN subsidiary, acquired the K&S from the original investors that year. In 1900, apart from 2,857 shares acquired in 1906, the KR&N became a wholly owned GN subsidiary.

Demise
Declining traffic led to mixed trains by 1902, the final year to achieve an operating profit. In 1904, CP declined an offer to buy the line. The next year, scheduled service to Cody ceased. In May 1908, slides rendered McGuigan Creek bridge unsafe for regular traffic. The final commercial train ran from Sandon that November, making McGuigan the western terminal. In October 1909, temporary bridge repairs reopened the closed section to facilitate the removal of track and sundry infrastructure. 
In July 1910, a forest fire destroyed almost everything west of Sproule's, which became the revised western terminal. CP having reiterated disinterest in a purchase, GN ceased operations in January 1911.

Revival
In May 1911, a local syndicate bought the K&S for $25,000. Trains ran throughout the summer as far as Mile 12 and to Sproule's in December and January. Service resumed the following April. CP assumed control in May 1912, but regular service to Sproule's was suspended until July. Operational until just after Christmas, the line also carried materials for the rebuild. Construction trains operated from March 1913 and regular service from June. The remaining narrow gauge equipment was withdrawn around April 1914.

Standard gauge

Proposal
In fall 1911, a $313,000 reconstruction estimate deterred CP from proceeding. However, the provincial government offered a large cash injection, which comprised a $100,000 grant and the repurchase of land grants elsewhere yielding $1,626,030, less the $25,000 purchase price.

Construction
Reconstruction commenced from both ends. At Parapet junction, east of Three Forks, the right-of-way doubled back before crossing Seaton Creek. Tracklaying commenced in summer 1912. A steam shovel excavated the grade for Parapet–Zincton, which opened in September 1912. After a hiatus exceeding two years, the Lucky Jim Mine resumed shipping ore. The next month, grading commenced for Zincton–Whitewater. The existing track was temporarily changed to standard gauge. In November, ore was moving from the mine. The permanent track opened the following month. In November 1913, the eastward advance reached Mile 12 and then Kaslo. During summer 1914, the route was ballasted and a turntable installed at Kaslo. In the fall, a new station building opened at Kaslo.

Operation
During December 1913 to March 1914, service westward terminated at Mile 12. In July 1914, a free Kaslo–Nakusp passenger excursion ran. The schedule settled into three times weekly. The final weekly passenger train travelled northeast of Rosebery in 1933. Damage from the 1955 floods on Carpenter Creek ended all traffic east of Denver Canyon.

Route
The original route climbed steeply northwestward at 3.25 per cent from Kaslo to the first bench, followed by a steady climb to the pass at Bear Lake, the summit. Tight curves were numerous. A spur served the Cody mines farther up the valley above Sandon.

The gradient of the revised route northeastward from Three Forks to Zincton was heavy, reaching 4.8 per cent. Northwestward from Kaslo, 3.4 per cent was the maximum. Three Forks to Sandon was 4.5 per cent southeastward.

Maps

Rail trail
The hiking trail to Payne Bluff is accessible from Sandon or Three Forks. The Kaslo River Trailway follows sections of the right-of-way between Kalso and Three Forks.

Footnotes

References

Defunct British Columbia railways
Narrow gauge railways in British Columbia
3 ft gauge railways in Canada
Slocan Valley
Great Northern Railway (U.S.) subsidiaries
Canadian Pacific Railway subsidiaries